John Brian Hogan (10 December 1947 – 27 November 2022) was an English professional rugby league footballer who played in the 1960s, 1970s and 1980s.

Playing career

International honours
Hogan won caps for England while at Wigan in the 1975 Rugby League World Cup against Wales, France, New Zealand and Australia, and in 1977 against Wales.

County League championships
Hogan played in Wigan's victory in the Lancashire League during the 1969–70 season.

Challenge Cup Final appearances
Hogan played left- in Bradford Northern's 14–33 defeat by Featherstone Rovers in the 1973 Challenge Cup Final  at Wembley Stadium, London on Saturday 12 May 1973, in front of a crowd of 72,395.

County Cup Final appearances
Hogan played left- in St. Helens' 2–2 draw with Warrington in the 1967 Lancashire Cup Final  at Station Road, Swinton on Saturday 7 October 1967 (he was replaced by Eric Chisnall in the replay), was an interchange/substitute in the 30–2 victory over Oldham in the 1968 Lancashire Cup Final at Central Park, Wigan on Friday 25 October 1968, played left- in Wigan's 13–16 defeat by Workington Town in the 1977 Lancashire Cup Final at Wilderspool Stadium, Warrington on Saturday 29 October 1977, and played right- in Widnes' 11–0 victory over Workington Town in the 1979 Lancashire Cup Final  at The Willows, Salford on Saturday 8 December 1979.

BBC2 Floodlit Trophy Final appearances
Hogan played right- in St. Helens' 4–7 defeat by Wigan in the 1968 BBC2 Floodlit Trophy Final  at Central Park, Wigan on Tuesday 16 December 1968, and played left- in Widnes' 7–15 defeat by Bramley in the 1973 BBC2 Floodlit Trophy Final at Naughton Park, Widnes on Tuesday 18 December 1973, and played left- in the 13–7 victory over St. Helens in the 1978 BBC2 Floodlit Trophy Final at Knowsley Road, St. Helens on Tuesday 12 December 1978.

Notable tour matches
Hogan was an interchange/substitute in St. Helens' 8–4 victory over Australia at Knowsley Road, St. Helens on Tuesday 24 October 1967.

Club career
Hogan made his debut for St. Helens in the 21–9 victory over Blackpool Borough in the Championship match during the 1965–66 season at Knowsley Roa on Friday 17 December 1965, and he played his last match for St. Helens in the 4–7 defeat by Wigan in the 1968–69 BBC2 Floodlit Trophy Final  at Central Park, Wigan on Tuesday 17 December 1968. Four days later, he made his debut for Wigan in the 14–2 victory over Workington Town at Central Park, Wigan on Saturday 21 December 1968. He played his last match in his second period with Wigan in the 21–15 victory over Castleford at Central Park, Wigan on Sunday 22 January 1978.

Personal life
Hogan died on 27 November 2022, at the age of 74.

References

External links
 Profile at saints.org.uk
 Statistics at wigan.rlfans.com
 Statistics at rugby.widnes.tv
 Statistics at orl-heritagetrust.org.uk

1947 births
2022 deaths
Bradford Bulls players
England national rugby league team players
English rugby league players
Lancashire rugby league team players
Oldham R.L.F.C. players
Place of birth missing (living people)
Rugby league props
St Helens R.F.C. players
Widnes Vikings players
Wigan Warriors players